This is a list of school districts in Mississippi.

Alcorn County

Alcorn School District
Corinth School District

Attala County

Attala County School District
Kosciusko School District

Bolivar County

Cleveland School District
North Bolivar Consolidated School District
West Bolivar Consolidated School District

Chickasaw County

Chickasaw County School District
Okolona Municipal Separate School District

Clarke County

Enterprise School District
Quitman School District

Coahoma County

Clarksdale Municipal School District
Coahoma County School District

Copiah County

Copiah County School District
Hazlehurst City School District

Forrest County

 Forrest County Agricultural High School
Forrest County School District
Hattiesburg Public School District
Petal School District

Hancock County

Bay St. Louis-Waveland School District
Hancock County School District

Harrison County

Biloxi Public School District
Gulfport School District
Harrison County School District
Long Beach School District
Pass Christian School District

Hinds County

Clinton Public School District
Hinds County Agricultural High School
Hinds County School District
Jackson Public School District

Itawamba County

Itawamba Agricultural High School
Itawamba County School District

Jackson County

Jackson County School District
Moss Point School District
Ocean Springs School District
Pascagoula-Gautier School District

Jasper County

East Jasper School District
West Jasper School District

Jones County

Jones County School District
Laurel School District

Lafayette County

Lafayette County School District
Oxford School District

Lauderdale County

Lauderdale County School District
Meridian Public School District

Lee County

Baldwyn School District
Lee County School District
Nettleton School District
Tupelo Public School District

Lincoln County

Brookhaven School District
Lincoln County School District
Mississippi School of the Arts

Lowndes County

Columbus Municipal School District
Lowndes County School District
Mississippi School for Mathematics and Science

Madison County

Canton Public School District
Madison County School District

Marion County

Columbia School District
Marion County School District

Marshall County

Holly Springs School District
Marshall County School District

Monroe County

Aberdeen School District
Amory School District
Monroe County School District

Neshoba County

Neshoba County School District
Philadelphia Public School District

Newton County

Newton County School District
Newton Municipal School District
Union Public School District

Panola County

North Panola School District
South Panola School District

Pearl River County

Pearl River County School District
Picayune School District
 Poplarville School District

Perry County

Perry County School District
Richton School District

Pike County

McComb School District
North Pike School District
South Pike School District

Pontotoc County

Pontotoc City School District
Pontotoc County School District

Prentiss County

Baldwyn School District
Booneville School District
Prentiss County School District

Rankin County

Pearl Public School District
Rankin County School District

Scott County

Forest Municipal School District
Scott County School District

Tallahatchie County

East Tallahatchie School District
West Tallahatchie School District

Tate County

Senatobia Municipal School District
Tate County School District

Tippah County

North Tippah School District
South Tippah School District

Union County

New Albany School District
Union County School District

Washington County

Greenville Public School District
Hollandale School District
Leland School District
Western Line School District

Yalobusha County

Coffeeville School District
Water Valley School District

Yazoo County

Yazoo City Municipal School District
Yazoo County School District

Single-District Counties

Amite County School District
Benton County School District
Calhoun County School District
Carroll County School District
Choctaw County School District
Claiborne County School District
Covington County School District
DeSoto County School District
Franklin County School District
George County School District
Greene County School District
Greenwood-Leflore Consolidated School District (Leflore County)
Grenada School District
Holmes County Consolidated School District
Humphreys County School District
Jefferson County School District
Jefferson Davis County School District
Kemper County School District
Lamar County School District
Lawrence County School District
Leake County School District
Louisville Municipal School District (Winston County)
Natchez-Adams School District (Adams County)
Noxubee County School District
Quitman County School District
Simpson County School District
Smith County School District
South Delta School District (Sharkey County)
Starkville Oktibbeha Consolidated School District (Oktibbeha County)
Stone County School District
Sunflower County Consolidated School District
Tishomingo County School District
Tunica County School District
Vicksburg-Warren School District (Warren County)
Walthall County School District
Wayne County School District
Webster County School District
West Point Consolidated School District (Clay County)
Wilkinson County School District
Winona-Montgomery Consolidated School District (Montgomery County)

Closed

Benoit School District
Clay County School District
Drew School District
Durant Public School District
Greenwood Public School District
Houston School District
Indianola School District
Leflore County School District
Lumberton Public School District
Montgomery County School District
Mound Bayou Public School District
North Bolivar School District
Oktibbeha County School District
Shaw School District
West Point School District
Winona Separate School District

See also
Choctaw Tribal School System – a non-public district operated by the Mississippi Band of Choctaw Indians.

References

Notes

External links
 

 
School districts
Mississippi
School districts